The term positive map may refer to:

 Positive-definite functions in classical analysis
 Choi's theorem on completely positive maps between C*-algebras (pronounced "C-star algebra")